Ian David Green (born 1946), is a male former athlete who competed for England.

Athletics career
He represented England and won a bronze medal in the 4 x 100 metres relay, at the 1970 British Commonwealth Games in Edinburgh, Scotland.

He ran for the Luton United AC and also competed in the 1969 European Athletics Championships.

References

1946 births
English male sprinters
Commonwealth Games medallists in athletics
Commonwealth Games bronze medallists for England
Athletes (track and field) at the 1970 British Commonwealth Games
Living people
Medallists at the 1970 British Commonwealth Games